Sahel Sounds is an American record label, based in Portland, Oregon which specializes in music from the southern part of the Sahara desert.

Details
Sahel Sounds was founded by Christopher Kirkley, a self-proclaimed "amateur ethnomusicologist", who traveled to Africa in 2008 after hearing a CD by Afel Bocoum. Kirkley spent almost two years in Mauritania, Mali, and Niger. When he returned, he started the label, which releases albums frequently recorded by Kirkley in the field. Some of the earliest releases were songs collected from musicians' cellphones, under the title Music from Saharan Cellphones. Problems there included finding out who these artists were so he could get the right permissions and to pay them for their music; he says that the artists received 60% of the proceeds from the first album. One of the artists featured on these compilations was Mdou Moctar, whom Kirkley convinced afterward to star in a remake of the Prince film Purple Rain. 

As an effort to steer clear of cultural appropriation, he claims complete transparency about finances, and divides all profits equally between the group and the label.

Artists
Ahmedou Ahmed Lowla
Ahmed Ag Kaedy
DJ Diaki
Etran de L'Air
Kader Tarhanin
Les Filles de Illighadad
Luka Productions
Mamman Sani
Mdou Moctar
Tallawit Timbouctou
Hama

Compilations
Music From Saharan Cellphones
Music From Saharan Whatsapp

See also 

 Desert blues

References

External links

American record labels
Desert blues